Kampong Rimba (from the Malay name, literally translates as 'Rimba Village') is a village on the outskirts of Bandar Seri Begawan, the capital of Brunei. It is one of the village subdivisions under Mukim Gadong 'A', a mukim in Brunei-Muara District. The population was 5,013 in 2016.

Facilities

Healthcare 
The village is home to the following healthcare facilities:
 Pengiran Anak Puteri Hajah Muta-Wakkilah Hayatul Bolkiah Health Centre, a community health centre for the residents of Mukim Gadong 'A' and Mukim Gadong 'B'
 Rimba Dialysis Centre, one of the few dedicated dialysis centres in the country

Mosque 
For the Jumu'ah (the congregational Friday noon prayers), the Muslim residents are served by the Raja Isteri Pengiran Anak Hajah Saleha Mosque.

Miscellaneous 
 Horticulture Business Centre — one of the few dedicated flower markets in the country. It is managed by the Agriculture and Agrifood Department, a government department under the Ministry of Primary Resources and Tourism.
 Civil Service Institute — the training agency for government civil servants

References 

Rimba